Ang Tong Reachea (1608–1640), also known as Ponhea Nou or Cau Bana Nu, was the Cambodian king reigned from 1631 to 1640. 

Ponhea Nou was the second son of Chey Chettha II. He succeeded the throne in 1631. His uncle Outey served as regent, assuming the title uprayorach (ឧភយោរាជ), the title usually borne by kings who had abdicated but retained executive powers.

Nou died in mysterious circumstances in June 1640. Although Ponhea Chan should be the next king, Outey forced Chan to give the crown to his own son Batom Reachea.

References

 Chroniques Royales du Cambodge de 1594 à 1677. École française d'Extrême Orient. Paris 1981 
 Achille Dauphin-Meunier  Histoire du Cambodge Presses universitaires de France, Paris 1968 Que sais-je ? n° 916. 

1608 births
1640 deaths
17th-century Cambodian monarchs